Ramchandra Babaldas Patel (born 1 August 1939), also known by his pen name Sukrit, is a Gujarati poet, novelist and short story writer from Gujarat, India.

Life
Ramchandra Patel was born on 1 August 1939 at Umta village (now in Mehsana district, Gujarat). He completed his primary and secondary education from Umta and Visnagar. After completing S. S. C., he joined Sheth C. N. College of Fine Arts, Ahmedabad and received D. T. C. He returned to Umta and joined High School as a drawing teacher. He retired from there after serving for 38 years. He was involved in discovery of medieval Jain temple in Rajgadhi mound in his village. He works in agriculture, education and social service.

Works
Patel's writing is influenced by his rural life and close contact with nature and agriculture. He has published two poetry collections, Mari Anagasi Rutu (1977) and Padmanidra (2001), containing metrical and non-metrical poetry. His love of nature and agriculture is evident in his poems. Simantara (2013) contains 81 poems.

He has written several novels. Ek Soneri Nadi (1978) depicts companionship of Suryadev and Rannade amid nature. Prithvini Ek Bari (1985) is its sequel. Varal (1979) is a story of a protagonist fighting against famine. It also explores the theme of oppressed people. Swargno Agni's (1981) protagonist becomes Kalki to save humanity through violence. In Amritkumbh (1982), the protagonist is fighting his own desires. In Chiryatri (1986), a person remembers his past in a village destroyed by desertification which he had left a long time ago. His other novels include: Rajgadhi (1996), Meruyagna (1998), Angarak (1999), Sonageru (2004), Aranyadwar (2006).

Sthalantar (1996) and Ek Bagalthelo (1998) are his short story collections about migration and its psychological impact.  Agiyar Dera (2012) is story collection set in rural environment. Adadho Sooraj Suko, Adadho Leelo (2000) is collection of essays on nature. He has edited Hu Khadamanthi Bahar (1972).

Awards
He was awarded the Kumar Suvarna Chandrak in 2004. He has also received prizes from the Gujarati Sahitya Parishad and the Gujarat Sahitya Akademi.

See also
 List of Gujarati-language writers

References 

1939 births
Living people
Poets from Gujarat
Gujarati-language writers
Indian male poets
Gujarati-language poets
People from Mehsana district
20th-century Indian poets
20th-century Indian male writers
20th-century Indian novelists
Indian short story writers
Indian novelists
Indian essayists